Maxim Alexandrovich Monahov (born 22 April 1996), better known as Mamix, is a Russian YouTuber. He publishes various DIY and experiment videos on his YouTube channels.

Repeated winner of silver and gold YouTube Play Buttons for achieving a level of one hundred thousand and a million subscribers. In 2020, one of his YouTube channels reached 10 million subscribers, making him also an owner of diamond creator award.

Early life and YouTube activity 
Maxim Monakhov was born on 22 April 1996, Rubtsovsk, Russia.

He started his YouTube activity in 2013. The first videos were reviews of other people's videos with comments, then he started publishing various videos where he pranked random peoples on Chatroulette, later for some time he published game videos.

In 2016 he began to publish pop-science experiments and DIY videos, then he got first popularity after the publication of the experiment where he mixed 10 thousand liters of Coca-Cola with Mentos (actually soda was used instead), after which in 2016 he moved to Novosibirsk, where he assembled an initiative team that helps him maintain channels on YouTube.

In 2020, he repeated the experiment with 10 thousand liters of Coca-Cola and soda.

On December 27, 2021, an explosion occurred during the filming of the video. As a results Mamix suffered a serious injury to his arm and was in a coma. In an audio recording published on March 3, 2022, maybe hear him counting down, but when he says "Let's go!" nothing happens. Seconds later, a loud explosion happens, and Mamix's team shouts to call an ambulance. Mamix said he received about 13 fractures and burns.

Awards

References

External links 
 
 

1996 births
Living people
People from Rubtsovsk
People from Novosibirsk
Russian YouTubers
Russian video bloggers
YouTube channels launched in 2013
DIY YouTubers